Tarhonya in Hungarian or tarhoňa in Slovak, is an egg-based noodle, often found in Hungary and Central Europe. 

It probably originates from the influence of the Ottoman empire and Turkish cuisine and the term likely comes from tarhana or of Persian origin, similar to the Persian tarkhane. The "barley" moniker is derived from its superficial resemblance to cooked pearl barley. Because of the relatively large size of the flakes, it is sometimes considered a type of small dumpling.

Tarhonya already appears in 16th-century handwritten Hungarian cookbooks. It is a simple product made of water, wheat flour, and whole eggs, that is formed into barley-sized "grains" by hand, or by cutting or grating, which makes it similar in appearance to large couscous. 

The grains, once dried and stored, can be roasted and then boiled before being used in a variety of dishes. They are served with meat or vegetable stews, egg dishes, roasted poultry, fried sausages, or in salads. In Hungary, tarhonya is fried in butter or lard before boiling.

See also 
 Farfel
 Ptitim (Israeli couscous)

References

External links 

 Making tarhonya
 Tarhonya in a list of "Other Noodles"
 Egg barley, Jewish style

Slovak cuisine
Hungarian cuisine
Noodles